Ryan Connelly (born October 3, 1995) is an American football middle linebacker for the New Orleans Saints of the National Football League (NFL).  He played college football at Wisconsin. He was drafted by the New York Giants in the fifth round of the 2019 NFL.

Professional career

Connelly was drafted by the New York Giants in the fifth round (143rd overall) of the 2019 NFL Draft.

New York Giants 
In Week 3 against the Tampa Bay Buccaneers, Connelly recorded his first interception off Jameis Winston in the 32-31 win. In Week 4, Connelly registered another interception off Case Keenum and recorded his first career sack in the 24-3 win. Unfortunately, Connelly suffered a torn ACL in the game and was ruled out for the season.

On September 5, 2020, Connelly was waived during final roster cuts.

Minnesota Vikings 
On September 6, 2020, Connelly was claimed off waivers by the Minnesota Vikings. He was placed on injured reserve on December 13.

Connelly was placed on the reserve/PUP list to start the season on August 23, 2022. He was activated on October 4, then waived and re-signed to the practice squad.

New Orleans Saints
On January 26, 2023, Connelly signed a reserve/future contract with the New Orleans Saints.

References

External links
Wisconsin Badgers bio
Minnesota Vikings bio

1995 births
Living people
People from Eden Prairie, Minnesota
Players of American football from Minnesota
Sportspeople from the Minneapolis–Saint Paul metropolitan area
American football linebackers
Wisconsin Badgers football players
New York Giants players
Minnesota Vikings players